A special election for Massachusetts's 5th congressional district took place on December 10, 2013, due to the resignation of Democratic Congressman Ed Markey following his election to the United States Senate in a special election on June 25, 2013. Primary elections were held on October 15, in which Democratic state senator Katherine Clark and Republican Frank Addivinola won their party nominations. State law required that Governor Deval Patrick call a special election between 145 and 160 days after the vacancy became official. On December 10, Clark easily defeated Addivinola with almost 2/3 of the vote, holding the seat for the Democrats. Clark's win marked the 92nd consecutive U.S. House loss by Republicans in Massachusetts since 1996.

Democratic primary

Candidates

Declared
 Will Brownsberger, state senator
 Katherine Clark, state senator
 Peter Koutoujian, Sheriff of Middlesex County and former state representative
 Martin Long, former member of the Lexington School Committee
 Paul Maisano
 Carl Sciortino, state representative
 Karen Spilka, state senator

Declined
 Warren Tolman, former state senator

Endorsements

Polling

 * Internal poll for Katherine Clark Campaign
^ Internal poll for Karen Spilka Campaign

Results

Republican primary

Candidates

Declared
 Frank Addivinola, lawyer and candidate for the 5th congressional district in 2012
 Mike Stopa, physicist and candidate for Massachusetts's 3rd congressional district in 2010
 Tom Tierney, actuary and nominee for the 5th congressional district in 2012

Polling

Results

General election

References

External links
Frank Addivinola for U.S. Congress official campaign website
Will Brownsberger for U.S. Congress official campaign website
Katherine Clark for U.S. Congress official campaign website
Peter Koutoujian for U.S. Congress official campaign website
Carl Sciortino for U.S. Congress official campaign website
Karen Spilka for U.S. Congress official campaign website
Mike Stopa for U.S. Congress official campaign website

Massachusetts 2013 05
Massachusetts 2013 05
2013 05 Special
Massachusetts 05 Special
United States House of Representatives 05 Special
United States House of Representatives 2013 05